The 1974 Australian Touring Car Championship was the 15th running of the Australian Touring Car Championship. It began at Symmons Plains on 4 March 1974 and ended at Adelaide International Raceway on 9 June after eight rounds. The championship was won by Peter Brock, driving for the Marlboro Holden Dealer Team in a Holden LJ Torana GTR XU-1 and a Holden LH Torana SL/R 5000.

Drivers
The following drivers competed in the 1974 Australian Touring Car Championship.

Calendar
The 1974 Australian Touring Car Championship consisted of seven rounds.

Drivers Championship
Points were awarded 4-3-2-1 for the first four race positions, and then 9-6-4-3-2-1 for the top 6 of each class.

Round 5 consisted of two separate races, one for over 3 litre cars and one for under 3 litre cars.

References

Australian Touring Car Championship seasons
Touring Cars